Atkinson Hall may refer to:

Atkinson Hall, Georgia College, Milledgeville, Georgia
Atkinson Hall (Geneseo, Illinois)
Atkinson Hall at Calit2, University of California, San Diego